Birtouta is a district in Algiers Province, Algeria. It was named after its capital, Birtouta.

Municipalities
The district is further divided into 3 municipalities:
Birtouta
Ouled Chebel 
Tessala El Merdja

Notable people

Districts of Algiers Province